Maurice André (21 May 1933 – 25 February 2012) was a French trumpeter, active in the classical music field.

He was professor of trumpet at the Conservatoire National Supérieur de Musique in Paris where he introduced the teaching of the piccolo trumpet including the Baroque repertoire on trumpet. André has inspired many innovations on his instrument and he contributed to the popularization of the trumpet.

Biography
André was born in Alès in the Cévennes, into a mining family. His father was an amateur musician; André studied trumpet with a friend of his father, who suggested that André be sent to the conservatory. In order to gain free admission to the conservatory, he joined a military band. After only six months at the conservatory, he won his first prize.

At the conservatory, André's professor, Raymond Sabarich, reprimanded him for not having worked hard enough and told him to return when he could excel in his playing. A few weeks later, he returned to play all fourteen etudes found in the back of Arban's book to a very high standard. Sabarich later said that "it was then that Maurice Andre became Maurice Andre." Maurice André won the Geneva International Music Competition in 1955, together with Theo Mertens, and the ARD International Music Competition in Munich in 1963.  He was made an honorary member of the Delta chapter of Phi Mu Alpha Sinfonia at Ithaca College in New York in 1970.

André rose to international prominence in the 1960s and 1970s with a series of recordings of baroque works on piccolo trumpet for Erato and other labels. He also performed many transcriptions of works for oboe, flute, and even voice and string instruments. André had over 300 audio recordings to his name, from the mid-1950s to his death.

André had three children: Lionel (1959–1988), trumpeter and music teacher; Nicolas, who plays the trumpet; and Béatrice, who plays the oboe. All three performed with their father in concert. He also made several recordings with his brother Raymond (b. 1941).

One of André's students, Guy Touvron, wrote a biography entitled Maurice André: Une trompette pour la renommée (Maurice André: A Trumpet for Fame), which was published in 2003.

André spent the last few years of his life in retirement in southern France. He died at the age of 78 in a hospital in Bayonne on 25 February 2012. He is buried in the cemetery of the village of Saint-André-Capcèze (in the Lozère).

References

External links
Maurice André website, part of the French Ministry of Culture's portal (French/English)
Webpage with rich information about Maurice André
Maurice André and Prague. Documents and reminiscences on the recording of the Brandenburg Concerto No. 2 in F major in 1965 (Maurice André, Milan Munclinger, Ars Rediviva)
AllMusic Guide to Maurice Andre Discography

1933 births
2012 deaths
People from Alès
EMI Classics and Virgin Classics artists
French classical trumpeters
Male trumpeters
French cornetists
Conservatoire de Paris alumni
Academic staff of the Conservatoire de Paris
Honorary Members of the Royal Academy of Music
20th-century French musicians
20th-century trumpeters
Chevaliers of the Légion d'honneur
20th-century French male musicians
Erato Records artists
20th-century classical musicians